Ayn al-Bayda which means White Spring, is a Syrian village located in Markaz Rif Dimashq District, Rif Dimashq. According to the Syria Central Bureau of Statistics (CBS), Ayn al-Bayda had a population of 1,252 in the 2004 census. Nearby localities include Al-Taybah, Khiyarat Dannun and Zakiyah.

References 

Populated places in Markaz Rif Dimashq District